Cardiff Sixth Form College, abbreviated to CSFC, is an independent mixed education sixth form college in Cardiff, Wales for 15- to 19-year-olds. The college is owned by Dukes Education.

History 

The college was established in 2004 as the Cardiff Centre of Excellence (CCOEX), and was originally intended as a private tutorial centre which met regularly in a local church. By 2008, it had become a private company limited by guarantee and had moved to a residential house on 97 Newport Road. In 2012, it was renamed the Cardiff Sixth Form College, and the college moved to its present site at Trinity Court.

New development 

In 2021, the college revealed plans to redevelop Merchant Place in Bute Place and Cory's Building in Bute Street and a new building at the rear. Both Merchant Place and Cory's Building are Grade II listed buildings and form an L shape.

Aims 
The college caters for students studying for their A Levels and uses the WJEC exam board for all subjects, but the main emphasis is on providing students with the relevant experiences and skills to enter the university of their choice. It also offers summer school courses based at its UK campus in Cardiff. The college has also made significant outreach efforts to recruit students from other countries and regions, most notably Botswana, Hong Kong, Malaysia and China.

Since 2013, the college has come top amongst other independent schools in the UK in league tables. It also has a long history in the NASA Space Settlement Design Competition and in local debate competitions.

Inspection

The first inspection of the college by Care Inspectorate Wales took place in 2016. No areas were identified where the college exceeded National Minimum Standards. Twelve recommendations were made.

Results 

In 2019, 90% of students achieved A*-A grades, whilst 99% of students achieved A*-B grades. For eight years running, Cardiff Sixth Form College has been awarded Top Private Co-educational Boarding School and Top Independent Sixth Form College in the Education Advisers' Awards. 

Cardiff Sixth Form College has been ranked number one for A-Level results in league tables published by The Telegraph, The Times and best-schools.co.uk

Legal issues 
In November 2016, the former trustees of the college were the subject of an inquiry by the Charities Commission due to failure to submit their accounts on time. The Charity Commission has identified regulatory concerns about the charity's governance, financial management and significant related party transactions between the charity and some of its former trustees. An interim manager was appointed to oversee the running of the college over the course of the inquiry. South Wales Police were looking into potential fraud at the college by the former trustees.

Notes

External links
 
Cardiff Sixth Form College website

Education in Cardiff
Sixth form colleges in Wales
Educational institutions established in 2004
2004 establishments in Wales